Tie Ya Na or Tie Yana (born 13 May 1979) is a table tennis player from Hong Kong, China who won two silver medals at the 2006 Asian Games in the singles and doubles competitions.

Tie played for China in the Universiade before emigrating to Hong Kong in 2002.

She is married to Tang Peng, another table tennis player representing Hong Kong.

Career records
Singles (as of 9 November 2014)
Olympics: QF (2004, 08).
World Championships: round of 16 (2003, 05, 11).
World Cup appearances: 11. Record: runner-up (2008); 3rd (2002, 04, 11).
Pro Tour winner (8): Korea Open 2002; Brazil Open 2003; Russian Open 2004; Croatian Open 2004; Korea, Chinese Taipei Open 2006; Brazil Open 2007; Hungarian Open 2010. Runner-up (2): USA, Swedish Open 2005.
Pro Tour Grand Finals appearances: 9. Record: SF (2005).
Asian Games: runner-up (2006).
Asian Championships: SF (2003).
Asian Cup: 1st (2004); 3rd (2003, 05).

Women's doubles
Olympics: QF (2004).
World Championships: SF (2005, 09, 11)
Pro Tour winner (14): Russian, Slovenian, Croatian, Chile, USA, German, Swedish Open 2005; Korea, Japan Open 2006; Brazil, Chile Open 2007; Chile, China (Shanghai) Open 2008, Spain 2011. Runner-up (8): Italian Open 2002; Danish Open 2003; Qatar, Singapore Open 2006; Qatar, Austrian Open 2007; Kuwait, Korea Open 2009.
Pro Tour Grand Finals appearances: 9. Record: runner-up (2009, 2010); SF (2004, 07, 08).
Asian Games: runner-up (2006)
Asian Championships: SF (2003, 05, 07)

Mixed doubles
World Championships: SF (2007)
Asian Games: winner (2002)
Asian Championships: runner-up (2007); SF (2003)

Team
Olympics: 5th (2008, 2012)
World Championships: 2nd (2004, 06); 3rd (2008, 2012)
World Team Cup: 3rd (2007, 09, 2013)
Asian Championships: 1st (2005); 2nd (2003)

References

1979 births
Living people
People from Zhengzhou
Table tennis players from Henan
Hong Kong female table tennis players
Olympic table tennis players of Hong Kong
Table tennis players at the 2004 Summer Olympics
Table tennis players at the 2008 Summer Olympics
Table tennis players at the 2012 Summer Olympics
Table tennis players at the 2016 Summer Olympics
World Table Tennis Championships medalists
Asian Games gold medalists for Hong Kong
Asian Games silver medalists for Hong Kong
Asian Games medalists in table tennis
Medalists at the 2002 Asian Games
Medalists at the 2006 Asian Games
Table tennis players at the 2002 Asian Games
Table tennis players at the 2006 Asian Games
Table tennis players at the 2010 Asian Games
Table tennis players at the 2014 Asian Games
Universiade gold medalists for China
Universiade medalists in table tennis
Medalists at the 2001 Summer Universiade
20th-century Hong Kong women
21st-century Hong Kong women